Patrick Scheuermann (pronounced "Sherman") is the former Director of the NASA Marshall Space Flight Center located in Huntsville, Alabama. He was named to become the center's twelfth director on September 25, 2012. He succeeds Robin Henderson, who had served as acting director for the preceding two months. Scheuermann served as the director of the John C. Stennis Space Center near Bay St. Louis, Mississippi from March 2010 until his appointment to Marshall. Earlier in his NASA career, he served as legislative fellow to Senate Majority Leader Trent Lott.

References

External links 
 Marshall Space Flight Center website

Living people
Directors of the Marshall Space Flight Center
NASA people
People from New Orleans
University of New Orleans alumni
Year of birth missing (living people)
Recipients of the NASA Distinguished Service Medal